The 1989–90 Vancouver Canucks season was the team's 20th in the National Hockey League (NHL).

Offseason

Regular season

Final standings

Schedule and results

Playoffs
Did not qualify

Player statistics

Scoring leaders

Note: GP = Games played; G = Goals; A = Assists; Pts = Points; +/- = Plus/minus; PIM = Penalty minutes

Goaltending
Note: GP = Games played; TOI = Time on ice (minutes); W = Wins; L = Losses; T = Ties; GA = Goals against; SO = Shutouts; Sv% = Save percentage; GAA = Goals against average

Awards and records

Transactions

Draft picks 
Vancouver's picks at the 1989 NHL Entry Draft in Bloomington, Minnesota.

Farm teams
Milwaukee Admirals (IHL)

See also
1989–90 NHL season

References

External links

Vancouver Canucks seasons
Vancouver C
Vancouver